Briesen (Mark) is a village and a municipality in the Oder-Spree district, Brandenburg, Germany. It is situated east of the capital Berlin, between the towns Fürstenwalde and Frankfurt an der Oder. Briesen was first mentioned in 1403.

Local government

Since 2014 the municipality Briesen consists of the villages Alt Madlitz, Biegen, Briesen, Falkenberg and Wilmersdorf. It is part of Amt Odervorland. Its governing council, dealing with local affairs, consists of 12 seats.

Demography

References

External links

 Official website of Briesen (Mark) 

Localities in Oder-Spree